Alexander Haslett (24 July 1883 – 17 January 1951) was an Irish Independent politician. He was an independent Teachta Dála (TD) for the Monaghan constituency in Dáil Éireann from June 1927 to 1932 and from 1933 to 1937. He stood as an "unofficial Protestant candidate". His failure to be elected in both 1937 and 1943 was due to the continuing decline in numbers of the Protestant population in County Monaghan. Fine Gael also ran a Protestant candidate (Ernest Blythe).

He was born on 24 July 1883 in Glaslough, County Monaghan, the youngest son among four sons and one daughter of James Haslett, farmer, and Mary Haslett (née Watt). He was educated at Glaslough national school, while each of his siblings emigrated to the US, he farmed the family holding at Derryvane, selling it in 1921 to purchase a substantially larger farm at Mulladuff. Elected in 1912 to Monaghan rural council and board of guardians, he was secretary until 1920 of the Monaghan branch of the Ulster Farmers' Union. In the mid-1920s he launched an auctioneering business in Glaslough and Monaghan town, and served as council member and sometime president of the Irish Auctioneers' Association. He was active in the Orange Order, he became prominent locally in the affiliated Protestant Defence Association (organised in 1920 amid the political violence of the time) at a time when unionists in Monaghan and throughout the twenty-six southern counties were assessing their position in the face of devolved government, and the exclusion of three Ulster counties from Northern Ireland.

Haslett was a Presbyterian – a member of the Ballyalbany Congregation in Monaghan town – who had purchased his own small farm under the Land Purchase (Ireland) Act 1903. He was a very prominent member of the Orange Order and served as Deputy County Grand Master for Monaghan. He has been described as one of those who "were determined not only to stay but with dignity to play their part and make a contribution to the local commercial and political life" "On 12 July 1923 the only Orange demonstration to be held in the Free State that year took place at Killacoonagh near Clones. Alexander Haslett ... addressing the Orangemen that day said: 'We are not going to be sulking in a corner. We have to live in this country and we are going to make the best of it.'", cited in.

References

1883 births
1951 deaths
Independent TDs
Irish Presbyterians
Members of the 5th Dáil
Members of the 6th Dáil
Members of the 8th Dáil
Politicians from County Monaghan